The European Commissioner for External Relations was a member of the European Commission with responsibility over the Commissions external representation in the world and the European Union's (EU) Neighbourhood Policy (ENP). The responsibility was shared though between other Commission posts (see below) and the High Representative.

The first Commissioner to hold the post was Jean Rey in 1958, who later became Commission President. The last Commissioner was Benita Ferrero-Waldner who served from 2004 to 2009 in the first Barroso Commission.

As a result of the Treaty of Lisbon, on 1 December 2009, merged the positions of Commissioner and High Representative into a composite entity called the High Representative of the Union for Foreign Affairs and Security Policy.

List of commissioners
The post has been under various names (External Relations/External Affairs) and often combined with Trade or other portfolios. In the Barroso I Commission it was combined with the European Neighbourhood Policy portfolio, hence its name under that administration. Ferrero-Waldner was also the last Commissioner for External Relations as the post was taken over by the High Representative Catherine Ashton from 1 December 2009.

As a result of the ratification of the Treaty of Lisbon, the Commissioner position was merged with that of the High Representative for the Common Foreign and Security Policy to become the High Representative of the Union for Foreign Affairs and Security Policy. However Ferrero-Waldner maintained control over the European Neighbourhood Policy and EuropeAid Co-operation Office (which are not part of the new High Representative's mandate).

Since the establishment of the High Representative, there are now only the following Commissioners dealing with international affairs;
 European Commissioner for Enlargement and European Neighbourhood Policy
 European Commissioner for International Cooperation, Humanitarian Aid and Crisis Response
 European Commissioner for Trade

Related posts
The external relations policy of the Barroso Commission is based on three key basic propositions on the EU's role in the world. The EU is a global player; it pursues a specific foreign policy philosophy which one could term "effective multilateralism"; and, thanks to its specific nature, the EU disposes of a wide range of foreign policy instruments which are particularly suited to respond to today's challenges. In his first Commission, President Barroso established a Group of Commissioners, chaired by him, and in charge of six external relations services. Prior to its abolition, there were four external relations posts;

Benita Ferrero-Waldner was deputy chair of the Group of External Relations Commissioners, and responsible for External Relations and European Neighbourhood Policy. She was responsible for two Commission Directorate-Generals: External Relations (Relex) and the EuropeAid Co-operation Office (Aidco).
Catherine Ashton was responsible for External Trade. The Directorate General for Trade of the European Commission is in charge of implementing the external trade policy of the European Union. International trade is forefront of international relations.
Louis Michel was responsible for Humanitarian Aid and Development Policy. A closely related goal is enhancing the effectiveness of the Union's development assistance. He was responsible for two Directorate-Generals: the European Commission Humanitarian Aid Office (ECHO) and Development.
Olli Rehn was responsible for Enlargement. This has been the key tool in enhancing the European model and meeting the objectives of foreign and security policy. The Enlargement Directorate General managed the process under his responsibility.

See also
Directorate-General for External Relations
Common Foreign and Security Policy
Foreign relations of the European Union

References

External links
 Commissioner's website
 The Commissioner's Cabinet
 External Relations' website
 EU in the world website
 ENP website

External Relations
Commissioner